Hellab (also Romanized as Hellāb, Halāb, Ḩallāb, and Hel Āb) is a village in Rezvaniyeh Rural District, in the Central District of Tiran and Karvan County, Isfahan Province, Iran. At the 2006 census, its population was 45, in 17 families.

References 

Populated places in Tiran and Karvan County